Josaphat Park is a public park of  located in the municipality of Schaerbeek in Brussels, Belgium. The football stadium that was formerly used by the K.V.V. Crossing Elewijt lies on the north-western corner of the park. There is also an elementary school (Chazal school), a tennis club (R.T.C. Lambermont), the municipal greenhouses, animals (horses, donkeys, hen, ducks), two playgrounds, a minigolf course, an archery range, three cafés (La Laiterie, La Buvette Saint-Sebastiaan, and La Guinguette Populeir), a kiosk (Josaphine's), and some ponds.

The park is a remainder of the old Linthout forest that began at the /. It was designed by Edmond Galoppin of Melsbroek and inaugurated by King Leopold II on 6 June 1904. Its name comes from the resemblance between the valley of the Roodebeek (a tributary of the Maalbeek) where the park is located and the Valley of Josaphat in the Holy Land, noted by a pilgrim back from Palestine in 1574. It was designated on 31 December 1974.

Sculptures
Josaphat Park contains a large collection of sculptures, including works by sculptors Jules Lagae, Victor Rousseau, Albert Desenfans, Joseph Van Hamme, and Jean Lecroart.

See also
 List of parks and gardens in Brussels

External links

 Description on the website of the Belgian Tourist Board

Parks in Brussels
Urban public parks
Schaerbeek